Yasin Avcı (born 10 April 1983) is a Turkish professional footballer who plays as a right winger for Tirespor.

References

External links

1983 births
Living people
Turkish footballers
Altay S.K. footballers
Göztepe S.K. footballers
Kardemir Karabükspor footballers
Bucaspor footballers
Şanlıurfaspor footballers
Süper Lig players
People from Tire, İzmir
Footballers from İzmir
TFF First League players
Association football midfielders